The Battle of Copenhagen of 1801 (Danish: Slaget på Reden), also known as the First Battle of Copenhagen to distinguish it from the Second Battle of Copenhagen in 1807, was a naval battle in which a British fleet fought and defeated a smaller force of the Dano-Norwegian Navy anchored near Copenhagen on 2 April 1801. The battle came about over British fears that the powerful Danish fleet would ally with France, and a breakdown in diplomatic communications on both sides.

As the British ships entered the harbour of the Danish fleet, several of its ships took up station in the city's inlet, forming a blockade. The Danish fleet defended the capital with these ships and bastions on both sides of the harbour inlet. It was the second attempt by the British to try to prevent a Franco-Danish alliance, as the British had already entered Øresund with a fleet in August 1800, in order to persuade Denmark not to ally with France. The Danes agreed to the British terms upon hearing news of the assassination of Tsar Paul I of Russia, as his death meant the end of the Russian-led League of Armed Neutrality of which Denmark was a member.

Background
The battle was the result of multiple failures of diplomacy in the latter half of the 18th century. At the beginning of 1801, during the French Revolutionary Wars, Britain's principal advantage over France was its naval superiority. The Royal Navy searched neutral ships trading with French ports, seizing their cargoes if they were deemed to be trading with France. It was in the British interest to guarantee its naval supremacy and all trade advantages that resulted from it. The Russian tsar, Paul, having been a British ally, arranged a League of Armed Neutrality comprising Denmark, Sweden, Prussia, and Russia, to enforce free trade with France.  The British viewed the League to be very much in the French interest and a serious threat. The league was hostile to the British blockade and, according to the British, its existence threatened the supply of timber and naval stores from Scandinavia.

In early 1801, the British government assembled a fleet off Great Yarmouth at Yarmouth Roads, with the goal of breaking up the league. The British needed to act before the Baltic Sea thawed and released the Russian fleet from its bases at Kronstadt and Reval (now Tallinn). If the Russian fleet joined with the Swedish and Danish fleets, the combined fleets would form a formidable force of up to 123 ships-of-the-line. The British fleet was under the command of Admiral Hyde Parker, with Vice Admiral Horatio Nelson as second-in-command.

Frustrated by the delay, Nelson sent a letter to Captain Thomas Troubridge, a friend and a Lord Commissioner of the Admiralty. This prompted the Earl of St Vincent (First Lord of the Admiralty) to send a private note, which resulted in the fleet sailing from Yarmouth on 12 March. Orders were sent to Parker to go to Copenhagen and detach Denmark from the league by "amicable arrangement or by actual hostilities", to be followed by "an immediate and vigorous attack" on the Russians at Reval and then Kronstadt.  The British fleet reached the Skaw (Danish: Skagen) on 19 March, where they met a British diplomat, Nicholas Vansittart, who told them that the Danes had rejected an ultimatum.

Although the Admiralty had instructed Parker to frustrate the league, by force if necessary, he was a naturally cautious person and moved slowly. He wanted to blockade the Baltic despite the danger of the combination of fleets; Nelson wanted to ignore Denmark and Sweden, who were both reluctant partners in the alliance, and instead sail to the Baltic to fight the Russians. In the end Nelson was able to persuade Sir Hyde to attack the Danish fleet currently concentrated off Copenhagen. Promised naval support for the Danes from Karlskrona, in Sweden, did not arrive, perhaps because of adverse winds. The Prussians had only minimal naval forces and also could not assist. On 30 March, the British force passed through the narrows between Denmark and Sweden, sailing close to the Swedish coast to put themselves as far from the Danish guns as possible; fortunately for the British, the Swedish batteries remained silent.

Attacking the Danish fleet would have been difficult as Parker's delay in sailing had allowed the Danes to prepare their positions well. Most of the Danish ships were not fitted for sea but were moored along the shore with old ships (hulks), no longer fit for service at sea, but still powerfully armed, as a line of floating batteries off the eastern coast of the island of Amager, in front of the city in the King's Channel. The northern end of the line terminated at the Tre Kroner forts ('Three Crowns' — Denmark, Norway, and Sweden, referring to the Kalmar Union, Three Crowns is also the Swedish coat of arms) armed with 68 guns (equal to twice the broadside of a  ship-of-the-line). North of the fort, in the entrance to Copenhagen harbour, were two ships-of-the-line, a large frigate, and two brigs, all rigged for sea, and two more hulks. Batteries covered the water between the Danish line and the shore, and further out to sea a large shoal, the Middle Ground, constricted the channel. The British had no reliable charts or pilots, so Captain Thomas Hardy spent most of the night of 31 March taking soundings in the channel up to the Danish line. Even so, the British ships were not able to locate the deepest part of the channel properly and so kept too far to seaward.

Battle

Preparations
Parker gave Nelson the twelve ships-of-the-line with the shallowest drafts, and all the smaller ships in the fleet. Parker himself stayed to the north-east of the battle with the heavier ships – whose deeper drafts did not allow them to safely enter the channel – screening Nelson from possible external interference and moving towards Copenhagen to engage the northern defences. Nelson transferred his command from the large 98-gun  to the shallower 74-gun  for this reason.

On 30 March, Nelson, and his second-in-command, Rear Admiral Thomas Graves, accompanied by Captain Domett and the commanding officer of the troops, Lieutenant Colonel William Stewart, sailed in the hired lugger Lark to reconnoitre the Danish defences at Copenhagen. They found the defences to be strong and so spent the evening discussing the plan. Fixed batteries had a significant advantage over ship borne cannon owing to their greater stability and larger guns, and the Danes could  reinforce their ships during the battle. On the other hand, their ships were a motley collection, many of them small, and out-gunned if engaged by the whole of Nelson's force.

Nelson's plan was for the British ships to approach the weaker, southern end of the Danish defences in a line parallel to the Danish one. As the foremost ship drew alongside a Danish ship, it would anchor and engage that ship. The remainder of the line would pass outside the engagement until the next British ship drew alongside the next Danish ship, and so on. Troops would land and assault the Tre Kroner fortress once the fleet had subdued the Danish line of ships. Bomb vessels would sit outside the British line and bombard the Danes by firing over it. Should the British be unable to subdue the stronger, northern defences, the destruction of the southern ships would be enough to allow the bomb vessels to approach within range of the city and force negotiations to prevent the bombardment of the city.

Action

With a southerly wind on 2 April, Nelson picked his way through the shoals. However,  ran aground before entering the channel, and took no part in the battle.  Then  and  ran aground on the Middle Ground, severely restricting their role in the battle. The loss of the three vessels required hurried changes in the line and weakened the force's northern end.

The Danish batteries started firing at 10:05 am, the first half of the British fleet was engaged in about half an hour, and the battle was general by 11:30 am. Once the British line was in place there was very little manoeuvring. The British ships anchored by the stern about a cable from the line of Danish ships and batteries, which was relatively long range, and the two exchanged broadsides until a ship ceased firing. The British encountered heavy resistance, partly because they had not spotted the low-lying floating batteries, and partly because of the courage with which the Danes fought. The northern Danish ships, which were rigged and manned, did not enter the battle but remained on station as reserve units, even though the wind direction forced Parker's squadron to approach only slowly.

At 1:00 pm, the battle was still in full swing.

Signal to retreat
Admiral Parker could see little of the battle owing to gun smoke, but could see the signals on the three grounded British ships, with Bellona and Russell flying signals of distress and Agamemnon a signal of inability to proceed. Thinking that Nelson might have fought to a stand-still but might be unable to retreat without orders (the Articles of War demanded that all ranks "do their utmost" against the enemy in battle), at 1:30  pm Parker told his flag captain:I will make the signal of recall for Nelson's sake. If he is in condition to continue the action, he will disregard it; if he is not, it will be an excuse for his retreat and no blame can be imputed to him.Nelson ordered that the signal be acknowledged, but not repeated. He turned to his flag captain, Thomas Foley, and said "You know, Foley, I only have one eye — I have the right to be blind sometimes," and then, holding his telescope to his blind eye, said "I really do not see the signal!" Rear Admiral Graves repeated the signal, but in a place invisible to most other ships while keeping Nelson's "close action" signal at his masthead. Of Nelson's captains, only Riou, who could not see Nelson's flagship Elephant, followed Parker's signal. Riou withdrew his force, which was then attacking the Tre Kroner fortress, exposing himself to heavy fire, which resulted in his death and the deaths of several crew members onboard Amazon.

End of the battle

It was at this time that the battle swung decisively to the British, as their superior gunnery took effect. The guns of the dozen southernmost Danish ships had started to fall silent owing to the damage they had sustained, and the fighting moved northward. According to British eyewitness accounts, much of the Danish line had fallen silent by 2:00 pm. The cessation of firing left the way open for the British bomb vessels to approach Copenhagen. In addition, the reinforcements of the ships from the shore batteries were causing the latter to become ineffective.

Nyborg tried to leave the line with Aggershuus in tow, but both sank. The most northerly ship, the frigate Hjælperen, successfully withdrew. The Danish commander, Commodore Olfert Fischer, moved from Dannebrog at 11:30 am, when it caught fire, to Holsteen. When Indfødsretten, immediately north of Holsteen, struck its colours at about 2:30 pm, he moved on to the Tre Kroner fortress. There he engaged three of Parker's ships, which had lost their manoeuvrability after being badly damaged and had drifted within range. Indfødsretten  resumed firing after Captain Schrodersee was ferried to it and took command of the ship.

Perhaps because of inexperienced crews, several Danish ships fired on British boats sent out to them after their officers had signalled their surrender. Nelson said that he "must either send on shore and stop this irregular proceeding, or send in our fire ships and burn them" and went to his cabin to write a note to the Danes. He sent it with a Danish-speaking officer, Captain Sir Frederick Thesiger, under a flag of truce to the Danish-Norwegian regent, Crown Prince Frederik, who had been watching the battle from the ramparts of the Citadel. The note read:

All action ceased when Crown Prince Frederick sent his Adjutant General, Hans Lindholm (a Danish member of parliament), asking for the reason for Nelson's letter. He was asked to put it in writing, which he did, in English, while making the joke:

In reply, Nelson wrote a note:

which was sent back to the Crown Prince. Following him there at 4:00 pm, a twenty-four-hour ceasefire was agreed.

Aftermath
After fighting had ended, the Danish flagship Dannebrog exploded at 4:30 pm, killing 250 men. By the end of the afternoon, three more badly-damaged British ships ran aground, including  Elephant. The Danish-Norwegian ships had been partly manned by volunteers, many having little or no naval experience, and as they were not all listed after the battle, it is uncertain what the exact Danish-Norwegian losses were. Estimates vary between 1,135 and 2,215 captured, killed or wounded. The official report by Olfert Fischer estimated the Danish-Norwegian casualties to be between 1,600 and 1,800 captured, killed or wounded. According to the official returns recorded by each British ship, and repeated in dispatches from Nelson and forwarded by Parker to the Admiralty, British casualties were 963 killed and wounded.

Of the Danish ships engaged in the battle, two had sunk, one had exploded, and twelve had been captured. The British could not spare men for manning prizes as they suspected that further battles were to come. They burned eleven of the captured ships, and only one, Holsteen, was sailed to England with the wounded under surgeon William Fergusson. Holsteen was then taken into service with the Royal Navy and renamed  (later ).

Subsequent events

The next day, Nelson landed in Copenhagen to open negotiations. Colonel Stewart reported that "the population showed an admixture of admiration, curiosity and displeasure". In a two-hour meeting with the Crown Prince (who spoke English), Nelson was able to secure an indefinite armistice. He then tried to convince first Fischer (whom he had known in the West Indies), and then the Prince, of British protection against the Russians. Negotiations continued by letter and on 8 April Nelson returned in person with a formal agreement.

The one sticking point out of the seven articles was a sixteen-week armistice to allow action against the Russians. At this point Stewart claims that one of the Danes turned to another and said in French that disagreement might lead to a renewal of hostilities. "Renew hostilities!" responded Nelson, and turning to his interpreter said "Tell him that we are ready in a moment; ready to bombard this very night!" Hurried apologies followed (the British fleet now occupied positions that would allow the bombardment of Copenhagen) and agreement was reached and signed the next day. The armistice was reduced to fourteen weeks, but during it armed neutrality would be suspended and the British were to have free access to Copenhagen. Danish prisoners were also paroled. In the final hour of negotiations, the Danes found out (but not the British) that Tsar Paul had been assassinated. This resulted in the dissolution of the League of Armed Neutrality and allowed the Danes to accept British terms. The final peace agreement was then signed on 23 October 1801.

On 12 April, Parker sailed to Karlskrona and on the British approach, the Swedish fleet returned to the port where Parker attempted to persuade them to also leave the League. Parker refused to sail into the eastern Baltic and instead returned to Copenhagen, where he found that news of his lack of vigour had reached London. On 5 May, he was recalled and ordered to hand his command over to Nelson. Nelson sailed eastwards again and, leaving six ships-of-the-line at Karlskrona, he arrived at Reval on 14 May to find that the ice had melted and the Russian fleet had departed for Kronstadt. He also found out that negotiations for ending the armed neutrality had started and so withdrew on 17 May. As a result of the battle, Lord Nelson was created Viscount Nelson of the Nile.

This was not the end of the Danish-Norwegian conflict with the British. In 1807, similar circumstances led to another British attack, in the Second Battle of Copenhagen.

Ships involved

United Kingdom
Nelson's squadron
 Polyphemus 64 (Captain John Lawford)
 Isis 50 (Captain James Walker)
 Edgar 74 (Captain George Murray)
 Ardent 64 (Captain Thomas Bertie)
 Glatton 54/56 (Captain William Bligh)
 Elephant 74 (flag of Vice-Adm. Lord Nelson, Captain Thomas Foley)
 Ganges 74 (Captain Thomas Francis Fremantle)
 Monarch 74 (Captain James Robert Mosse and thereafter Lt. John Yelland)
 Defiance 74 (2nd flag of Rear-Adm. Thomas Graves, Captain Richard Retalick)
 Russell 74 (Captain William Cuming)
 Bellona 74 (Captain Thomas Boulden Thompson)
 Agamemnon 64 (Captain Robert Devereux Fancourt)
 Désirée 36 (Captain Henry Inman)
 Amazon 38 (Captain Edward Riou)
 Blanche 36 (Captain Graham Eden Hamond)
 Alcmène 32 (Captain Samuel Sutton)
 Jamaica 24 (Captain Jonas Rose)
 Arrow (ship-sloop, Captain William Bolton)
 Dart (ship-sloop, Captain John Ferris Devonshire)
 Cruizer (brig-sloop, Cmdr. James Brisbane)
 Harpy (brig-sloop, Cmdr. William Birchall)
 Discovery (bomb, Cmdr. John Conn)
 Explosion (bomb, Cmdr. John Henry Martin)
 Hecla (bomb, Cmdr. Richard Hatherill)
 Sulphur (bomb, Cmdr. Hender Whitter)
 Terror (bomb, Cmdr. Samuel Campbell Rowley)
 Volcano (bomb, Cmdr. James Watson)
 Zebra (bomb, Cmdr. Edward Sneyd Clay)
 Otter (fireship, Cmdr. George M'Kinley)
 Zephyr (fireship, Cmdr. Clotworthy Upton

Parker's reserve
 London 98 (flag of Admiral Sir Hyde Parker, with 1st Captain William Domett and 2nd Captain Robert Walker Otway)
 St George 98 (Captain Thomas Masterman Hardy)
 Warrior 74 Captain Charles Tyler
 Defence 74 (Captain Henry Paulet)
 Saturn 74 (Captain Robert Lambert)
 Ramillies 74 (Captain James William Taylor Dixon)
 Raisonnable 64 (Captain John Dilkes)
 Veteran 64 (Captain Archibald Collingwood Dickson)

Denmark-Norway
Fischer's division in the King's Deep
(order south–north. Only Sjælland and Holsteen were in good condition, also note the age of the ships.)
These seven were listed by Nelson on 2 May 1801 with his numbering of actual gun ports in bold:
 Prøvesteenen 52/56 30/32 (3-decker battleship, rebuilt as a two-deck defensionsskib ('defense-ship'), Kaptain L. F. Lassen
 Wagrien 48/52 26/28 (2-decker ship of the line, 1775, later cut down in size), Kaptajn F.C. Risbrich
 Jylland 48/54 26/28 (Originally 70 gun 2-decker ship of the line, 1760, later cut down in size), Kaptajn E.O. Branth
 Dannebrog 64 26/28 (flag, 2-decker ship of the line, 1772), Kaptajn F.A. Bruun
 Sjælland 74 30/32 (2-decker ship of the line, 1776), Kaptajn F.C.L. Harboe
 Holsteen 64 26/28 (ship of the line, 1772), Kaptajn J. Arenfelt
 Indfødsretten 64 26/28 (2-decker ship of the line, 1786), Kaptajn A. de Turah
Others:
 Rendsborg 20 (pram), Kaptajnløjtnant C.T. Egede
 Nyborg 20 (pram) Kaptajnløjtnant C.A. Rothe
 Sværdfisken 18/20 (radeau, 1764), Sekondløjtnant S.S. Sommerfeldt
 Kronborg 22 (frigate, 1779), Premierløjtnant J.E. Hauch
 Hajen 18/20 (radeau, 1793), Sekondløjtnant Jochum Nicolay Müller|J.N. Müller
 Elven 10 (frigate, 1800), Kaptajnløjtnant H. Holsten
 Flådebatteri No. 1 20 (Grenier's float/Floating Battery No. 1 1787), Søløjtnant Peter Willemoes
 Aggershus 20 (Defensionsfartøj 'defence vessel') 1786), Premierløjtnant T. Fassing
 Charlotte Amalia 26 (Old Danish East Indiaman), Kaptajn H.H. Kofoed
 Søehesten 18 (radeau 1795), Premierløjtnant B.U. Middelboe
 Hielperen 16 (Defensionsfregat 'defence frigate'), Premierløjtnant P.C. Lilienskiold

Fischer's division in the Inner Run
(These ships did not see action)
 Elephanten 70
 Mars 74
 Sarpen 18-gun brig
 Nidelven 18-gun brig
 Danmark 74
 Trekroner 74 (not to be confused with Tre Kroner fortress)
All those listed in the Inner Run, apart from Elephanten  which was decommissioned later in 1801 and apparently used as a blockship and a powder store (Karduser), were captured by the British at the later Battle of Copenhagen (1807)

Fortifications
 Sea battery TreKroner - 68 guns
 Sea Battery Lynetten - unknown number of guns
 Land battery Sixtus  - unknown number of guns
 Land battery Quintus - unknown number of guns
 Fortress Kastellet - unknown number of guns

Steen Bille's division
These ships did not see action, the list is incomplete. Around 14 modern ships of the line and the same number of smaller ships were kept in the harbour.
 Iris 40
 Nykøbing
 Aalborg
 Christiansund
 Arendal
 Langesund
 Odense
 Flensborg
 Stege
 Staværn
 Viborg
 Naskau

Legacy

The death of Tsar Paul of Russia changed the diplomatic scene and reduced the political importance of the battle, and material losses in the battle were of little importance to the fighting strength of either navy (the Danish side had taken great care to spare its first-class ships), it did however demonstrate that British determination to ensure continued naval superiority in the war against France was supreme.

Cultural references
 Mister Christian by William Kinsolving, 1996. A novel in which Fletcher Christian returns from the South Seas and participates in the battle, crossing paths again with William Bligh.
 The Hope by Frederik Magle, 2001. A musical work commissioned by the Admiral Danish Fleet for the 200th anniversary of the battle.
 The Inshore Squadron, book 15 of the Bolitho novels by Alexander Kent, 1978. The build up to and fighting of the battle forms the setting for this story. As Bolitho must navigate the failing diplomacy with Denmark and lead the squadron sailing under his new flag

Gallery

See also

 List of Danish ships captured at Battle of Copenhagen
 Bibliography of 18th-19th century Royal Naval history

Notes

References

Sources
 Winfield, Rif (2005). British Warships in the Age of Sail, 1793–1817, Chatham Publishing,
 Naval wars in the Baltic 1553–1850 (1910) – R. C. Anderson
 Lauring, Palle (1972). Billeder af Danmarks historie. Copenhagen: Palle Lauring og Lademann Forlagsaktieselskab.
 Mahan, A.T. (1897). The Life of Nelson, Vol. II. (of 2) The Embodiment of the Sea Power of Great Britain  Sampson, Low, Marston and Company
  Nelson's dispatch to Parker about the battle.
 Nelson Society website which has transcriptions of the original British and Danish documents.
 Account including maps of the Battle of Copenhagen
 Lindeberg, Lars (1974). De så det ske: Englandskrigene 1801–14. Copenhagen: Lademann Forlagsaktieselskab.
 Great Britain's unprovoked assault on the neutral Danish-Norwegian kingdom from the Danish Naval History website
 Timeline of the battle from British point of view
 Consulatets og Keiserdømmets Historie af A. Thiers. Forhenværende Premierminister, Deputeret og Medlem af det franske Academi. Efter det Franske ved J. C. Magnus. Andet Bind (1845). Copenhagen: Brødrene Berling.
 Denmark and Great Britain Exhibition from the Orlogsmuseet.

Bibliography

 
 
 
 
 

Copenhagen
Copenhagen (1801)
Conflicts in 1801
Horatio Nelson
1801 in Denmark
19th century in Copenhagen
April 1801 events
1800s in Copenhagen